Stanislav Ježek (born 21 November 1976 in Prague) is a Czech slalom canoeist who has competed at the international level since 1994.

He won eight medals at the ICF Canoe Slalom World Championships with a gold (C1 team: 2002), a silver (C1 team: 2006), and six bronzes (C1: 2006, C1 team: 2003, 2005, 2007, 2010, 2011).

He is the overall World Cup champion in C1 from 1999 and 2011. He also won a total of 7 medals at the European Championships (1 gold, 3 silvers and 3 bronzes).

Ježek also competed at the 2008 Summer Olympics in Beijing. In the C1 event, he finished fourth in the qualification round, thus progressing to the semifinals. In the semifinals he finished second, managing to reach the top eight and the final round. In the final he finished fifth. At the 2012 Summer Olympics in London he repeated his 5th position in the C1 event. He also started in the C2 event with Vavřinec Hradilek where they finished 9th after being eliminated in the semifinals.

Ježek is the nominated Dartfish representative for the Czech Republic and Slovakia.

World Cup individual podiums

1 World Championship counting for World Cup points

References

2010 ICF Canoe Slalom World Championships 12 September 2010 C1 men's team final results - accessed 12 September 2010.
Beijing2008.cm profile

External links

1976 births
Czech male canoeists
Olympic canoeists of the Czech Republic
Canoeists at the 2008 Summer Olympics
Canoeists at the 2012 Summer Olympics
Living people
Medalists at the ICF Canoe Slalom World Championships
Canoeists from Prague